Ellerslie may refer to: Town in Auckland region.

Places

Australia and New Zealand
 Ellerslie, New South Wales, Australia
 Ellerslie, New Zealand, a suburb of Auckland
 Ellerslie, Victoria, a town in the Shire of Moyne, Victoria, Australia

Canada
 Ellerslie, Prince Edward Island, a community in eastern Canada
 Ellerslie, Edmonton (area), a suburban area in Edmonton
 Ellerslie, Edmonton, a neighbourhood within this area
 Ellerslie Road, Edmonton, Alberta

United Kingdom
 Ellerslie, Oxford, the original name of Dorset House in Oxford, England
 Ellerslie Global Residence, a student accommodation at University of Leeds

United States

 Ellerslie (Millbrook, Alabama), listed on the National Register of Historic Places (NRHP) in Elmore County, Alabama
 Ellerslie, Georgia, an unincorporated community
 Ellerslie, Maryland, a small town in Allegany County
 Ellerslie (Glenwood, Maryland), a historic slave plantation
 Ellerslie (Port Tobacco, Maryland), listed on the NRHP
 Ellerslie (Linden, North Carolina), listed on the NRHP
 Ellerslie (Colonial Heights, Virginia), listed on the NRHP

Other
Ellerslie Member, a stratigraphical unit in the Western Canadian Sedimentary Basin
Ellerslie School (disambiguation)